The Walnut Street Historic District is a historic district in Oneonta, New York, USA. The district includes 44 structures located on: Dietz Street, Elm Street, Ford Avenue, Maple Street, and Walnut Street. Changes in rental regulations by the city government concern those involved with the preservation of the historic district.

It was listed on the National Register of Historic Places in 1980.

References

Historic districts on the National Register of Historic Places in New York (state)
National Register of Historic Places in Otsego County, New York